Chris Vorpahl (born ) is a Chilean female beach volleyball player and former indoor volleyball player. She was part of the Chile women's national volleyball team.

She participated at the 2011 Women's Pan-American Volleyball Cup. On club level she played for Boston College in 2011.

References

External links
https://eldeportero.cl/tag/chris-vorpahl/
https://eldeportero.cl/chris-vorpahl-y-fabianne-boogaerdt-ganaron-la-cuarta-fecha-de-la-liga-nacional-de-volleyball-playa/
 

1990 births
Living people
Chilean beach volleyball players
Chilean women's volleyball players
Place of birth missing (living people)
Boston College Eagles women's volleyball players
Expatriate volleyball players in the United States
Outside hitters
Chilean expatriate sportspeople
Chilean expatriates in the United States
21st-century Chilean women